Stoyan Kotsev (29 January 1945 – 22 August 2012) was a Bulgarian football manager and player, who played as a winger.

Honours

Manager
Slavia Sofia
Bulgarian League: 1995–96
Bulgarian Cup: 1995–96

References

External links
Profile at National-Football-Teams

Bulgarian footballers
Bulgaria international footballers
PFC Slavia Sofia players
First Professional Football League (Bulgaria) players
Bulgarian football managers
1945 births
2012 deaths
Association football midfielders
People from Botevgrad
Sportspeople from Sofia Province